The Martin Van Buren Barron House is located in Eau Claire, Wisconsin.

History
Martin Van Buren Barron was a prominent businessman and local politician. The house was listed on the National Register of Historic Places in 1983 and on the State Register of Historic Places in 1989.

References

Houses on the National Register of Historic Places in Wisconsin
National Register of Historic Places in Eau Claire County, Wisconsin
Houses in Eau Claire, Wisconsin
Carpenter Gothic houses in the United States
Carpenter Gothic architecture in Wisconsin
Houses completed in 1871